The Lord Lieutenant of Renfrewshire is the representative of the British Crown covering a lieutenancy area of the county of Renfrewshire in the west central Lowlands of Scotland.

The Lord Lieutenant deals with many of the ceremonial functions associated with representing the Sovereign in his area, co-ordinates Royal visits to the county, presents awards, maintains close links with HM Armed Forces and liaises with the Queen's private office on county matters.

The current Lord Lieutenant of Renfrewshire is, since March 2019, is Colonel Peter McCarthy. He is assisted by up to 26 Deputy Lieutenants, amongst them the Vice Lord Lieutenant, held  by Hugh McKechnie Currie. The Clerk to the Lieutenancy is Mrs Linda Hutchison and is based at the headquarters of East Renfrewshire Council in Giffnock.

The Renfrewshire lieutenancy was formed in 1794 when permanent lieutenancies were appointed by Royal Warrant to all the counties of Scotland. The Lord-Lieutenants (Scotland) Order 1996 defined the area of the Renfrewshire lieutenancy as covering the local government districts of Renfrew, Eastwood and Inverclyde - covering the area of the county of Renfrewshire. Later that year, these districts were altered into unitary council areas named Renfrewshire, Inverclyde and East Renfrewshire.

Current Lord Lieutenant

On 13 March 2019, the Queen announced that Colonel Peter McCarthy would take the position of Lord Lieutenant following the retirement of Guy Clark.

McCarthy was born in 1953 and after attending Welbeck College served as an army officer in the Royal Electrical and Mechanical Engineers. In 2004, he became an operations director for the British Red Cross. He was previously Vice Lord Lieutenant of Renfrewshire.

List of Lord Lieutenants of Renfrewshire

William McDowall 17 March 1794 – 3 April 1810
George Boyle, 4th Earl of Glasgow 11 April 1810 – 1820
Robert Walter Stuart, 11th Lord Blantyre 5 February 1820 – 1822
Sir Michael Shaw-Stewart, 5th Baronet 10 December 1822 – 25 August 1825
Archibald Campbell 11 August 1825 – 13 June 1838
Alexander Speirs 8 August 1838 – 5 October 1844
James Boyle, 5th Earl of Glasgow 19 October 1844 – 11 March 1869
Sir Michael Shaw-Stewart, 7th Baronet 20 April 1869 – 10 December 1903
Archibald Campbell, 1st Baron Blythswood 6 February 1904 – 8 July 1908 
Sir Thomas Glen-Coats, 1st Baronet 23 July 1908 – 12 July 1922
Sir Michael Hugh Shaw-Stewart, 8th Baronet 25 November 1922 – 29 June 1942
Alexander Archibald Hagart-Speirs 30 March 1943 – 1950 
Sir Walter Guy Shaw-Stewart, 9th Baronet 27 November 1950 – 1967
John Maclay, 1st Viscount Muirshiel 12 December 1967 – 1980
(John) David Makgill-Crichton-Maitland 13 November 1980 – 1994
James Goold, Baron Goold 28 October 1994 – 27 July 1997
Cameron Parker 24 June 1998 – 2007
Guy Clark FCSI JP 2 June 2007 – 28 March 2019 
Col. Peter McCarthy 28 March 2019 – Present

Deputy lieutenants
A deputy lieutenant of Renfrewshire is commissioned by the Lord Lieutenant of Renfrewshire. Deputy lieutenants support the work of the lord-lieutenant. There can be several deputy lieutenants at any time, depending on the population of the county. Their appointment does not terminate with the changing of the lord-lieutenant, but they usually retire at age 75.

20th Century
18 November 1999: Robert Wight Wilson, Esq.

External links
 Renfrewshire Lieutenancy official website

References

 

Renfrewshire
 
Renfrewshire